Carlslid is a residential area in Umeå, Sweden.

History
The names Carlslid, Carlshem and Carlshöjd originate from the inn Carlslund, which at the end of the 18th century was located where Älvans väg in Tomtebo exists in the present day.

External links
Carlslid at Umeå Municipality

Umeå